Location-based authentication is a special procedure to prove an individual's identity on appearance simply by detecting its presence at a distinct location.

To enable location-based authentication, a special combination of objects is required. 
 Firsthand, the individual that applies for being identified and authenticated has to present a sign of identity.
 Secondly, the individual has to carry at least one human authentication factor that may be recognized on the distinct location.
 Thirdly, the distinct location must be equipped with a resident means that is capable to determine the coincidence of individual at this distinct location.

Distinctiveness of locating 

Basic requirement for safe location-based authentication is a well-defined separation of locations as well as an equally well-defined proximity of the applying individual to this location.

Challenges 

, no offered technical solution for simple location-based authentication includes a method for limiting the granted access to the presence, hence terminating the granted authentication on leave. This defines a mandate either to include a new or an additional procedure for

 detecting the leave and closing the granted access,
 limiting the granted time for access
 combining the method with another specially suited authentication factor

See also 
 Authentication
 Two factor authentication
 Time-based authentication
 Real-time locating
 Security token
 Wireless

References

Research work 
 Location-based security for user's transactions across different domains. By Dhavalkumar Shah

Location-based
Wireless locating
Computer access control